Arachidyl alcohol, also 1-icosanol, is a waxy substance used as an emollient in cosmetics. It is a straight-chain fatty alcohol with 20 carbon atoms, typically obtained via the hydrogenation of arachidic acid or arachidonic acid, both of which are present in peanut oil. Its name is derived from that of the peanut plant (Latin: arachis).

References 

Fatty alcohols
Primary alcohols
Alkanols